is a Japanese freelance journalist and critic, a regular writer for CNET Japan, and a one-time reporter for Mainichi Shimbun. He was born in Hyōgo Prefecture.

Background 

After graduating from Okazaki high-school in Aichi Prefecture, Sasaki entered the Faculty of Political Science and Economics at Waseda University, but dropped out and in 1988 joined Mainichi Shimbun, where he was in charge of the criminal investigations division and reserve reporters, covering issues such as murder cases, international terror and computer crime.

In October 1999, he transferred to work for the magazine .

Activity 

Sasaki has a great interest in Internet media that emerged at the beginning of the 21st century, and since he became a freelancer this has been at the center of his work. He has also written extensively about the WaiWai scandal at the Mainichi Shimbun. He also covered Anti-Japaneseism which Sasaki called a "violent ideology" and self-contradictory.

References

External links 
Personal website
Articles at CNET Japan
The Birth of Blog Discourse by Toshinao Sasaki at Amazon.com
Flat Revolution by Toshinao Sasaki at Amazon.com

Japanese journalists
1961 births
Living people
Waseda University alumni